Gaius Calpurnius Piso was a Roman senator in the first century. He was the focal figure in the Pisonian conspiracy of AD 65, the most famous and wide-ranging plot against the throne of Emperor Nero.

Character and early life
Piso was extremely well liked throughout Rome. Through his father he inherited connections with many distinguished families, and from his mother great wealth. Piso came from the ancient and noble house of the Calpurnii and he distributed his great wealth among many beneficiaries of all Roman social classes. Among a wide range of interests, Piso sang on the tragic stage, wrote poetry, played an expert game of Latrunculi, and owned a villa at Baiae. He was the son of the consul Lucius Calpurnius Piso and his wife Licinia, daughter of the consul Marcus Licinius Crassus Frugi and sister of Marcus Licinius Crassus Frugi, a senator.

Piso was tall, good-looking, affable, and an excellent orator and advocate in the courts. Despite these facts Piso's overall integrity was questionable. According to Tacitus, Piso used his eloquence to defend his fellow citizens and was generous and gracious in speech, but lacked earnestness and was overly ostentatious, while craving the sensual. In AD 40, the emperor Caligula banished Piso from Rome after he took a fancy to Piso's wife, Livia Orestilla. Caligula forced Piso's wife to leave him, and then accused Piso of adultery with her in order to establish cause for banishment. Piso would return to Rome one year later, after Caligula's assassination.

Pisonian conspiracy and death

Claudius recalled Piso to Rome, probably soon after his accession in AD 41. He was suffect consul in an unknown year. Piso then became a powerful senator during the reign of Emperor Nero and in AD 65 led a secret initiative to replace Emperor Nero that became known as the Pisonian Conspiracy.

Piso leveraged senatorial anger with Nero to gain power. Already in AD 62, there had been talk among those of senatorial rank, in the nobility, and among the equites that Nero was ruining Rome. By AD 65, the city had endured the Great Fire of Rome, spurring groups of conspirators to come together under the leadership of Piso with the goal of killing Nero.

On 19 April, AD 65, the freedman Milichus betrayed Piso's plot to kill the emperor and the conspirators were all arrested. In all, 19 were put to death and 13 exiled, reflecting the massive scope of the conspiracy. Piso was ordered to commit suicide and so killed himself.

Piso was survived by his son, Calpurnius Piso Galerianus who married Calpurnia, daughter of Licinia Magna and Lucius Calpurnius Piso, who served as one of the consuls in 57. Galerianus was executed in 70 for opposing the emperor Vespasian.

Legacy
Piso is probably the one referred to by Calpurnius Siculus under the name of "Meliboeus", and he is the subject of the panegyric De laude Pisonis (On the praise of Piso).

See also
 Calpurnii Pisones

References

Sources

65 deaths
Ancient Roman politicians
Ancient Romans who committed suicide
Gaius
Forced suicides
Members of the Pisonian conspiracy
Senators of the Roman Empire
Suffect consuls of Imperial Rome
Year of birth unknown